Idebrando Dalsoto, known as Brandão (born 14 May 1970) is a former Brazilian football player.

Club career
He made his professional debut in the Segunda Liga for Os Belenenses on 3 April 1999 in a game against Felgueiras.

He made his Primeira Liga debut for Vitória de Guimarães on 20 August 1999 as a late substitute in a 1–1 draw against Vitória de Setúbal.

Honours
2000–01 Segunda Liga top scorer: 24 goals for Santa Clara.

References

1970 births
Sportspeople from Rio Grande do Sul
Living people
Brazilian footballers
Sociedade Esportiva e Recreativa Caxias do Sul players
Coritiba Foot Ball Club players
C.F. Os Belenenses players
Brazilian expatriate footballers
Expatriate footballers in Portugal
Liga Portugal 2 players
Vitória S.C. players
Primeira Liga players
C.D. Santa Clara players
Criciúma Esporte Clube players
Association football forwards